Mao Amin ( born 1962) is a Chinese singer known by the "honorific title" of Dajieda ("Big Sister"), "was one of China's most famous and senior female pop stars" by "the mid-1990s." In 2001, she was one of 36 Chinese athletes and entertainers who were depicted on a series of postage stamps issued "in support of Beijing's bid for hosting the 2008 Olympic Games."

Musical background in the mid-1980s
Mao along with fellow singer Liu Huan, "both household names among Chinese around the world," were "disciples" of "renowned vocal educator" Deng Zaijun.

Popularity in the late 1980s
While Nimrod Baranovitch writes that Mao became famous because of her "powerful and uninhibited" voice, All China Women's Federation contends that she "became famous after winning third place in the Yugoslavian International Musical Eisteddfod with Green Leaf and the Root. It was the highest honor a Chinese pop singer had ever been given in an international competition. But Mao became even more well known by singing in the Spring Festival Gala." Moreover, her performance in 1988 for the Chinese New Year TV Celebration "made both song and singer extremely popular in Mainland China." By the late 1980s, Mao "earned two thousand yuan for a single performance as China's biggest pop star..." The New Straits Times described her as "China's most popular singer," who "retains a nationalistic flavour in her songs," and "China's top pop singer for the past four years" before 1990.

Legal troubles in 1989
In 1989, "Mao, China's biggest pop star, was caught lying to the Beijing Evening News about under-the-table payments for performances in Harbin. In the ensuing scandal, she was fined 34,000 yuan and forced to pay 15,000 yuan in back taxes."

Transformation in 1990s
Following her legal troubles, Mao underwent a transformation towards seemingly feminist music, such as her 1994 single "Real Woman" off of her self-titled album.  These mid-1990s efforts received criticism as lacking the spirit and power of her 1980s work.

Filmography
 Love on the Cloud (2014)

See also 
 The Same Song

References 

1962 births
Living people
Chinese women singers
Singers from Shanghai
Participants in Chinese reality television series
Chinese people convicted of tax crimes